Boris Shapiro (born 1957, Moscow, Soviet Union) is a Russian-Swedish mathematician, whose research concerns differential equations, commutative algebra and Schubert calculus. The Shapiro–Shapiro conjecture (or simply the Shapiro conjecture) was named after Michael Shapiro and him (it is now the well-known Mukhin–Tarasov–Varchenko theorem).

Shapiro enrolled in the Ph.D. program at Moscow State University, Soviet Union in 1985 as a student of Vladimir Arnold, but his thesis defense was rejected by the examining committee. He then defended the same thesis at Stockholm University, Sweden in 1990, and was awarded his Ph.D. Ironically, he became the most prolific Ph.D. student of Arnold, in terms of academic descendance.  He has been a professor at Stockholm  University since 1993.

Selected papers
A. Postnikov, B. Shapiro, "Trees, parking functions, syzygies, and deformations of monomial ideals", Transactions of the American Mathematical Society 356 (8), pp. 3109–3142.
B. Shapiro, M. Shapiro, A. Vainshtein, "Ramified Coverings of S² With One Degenerate Branching Point And Enumeration of Edge-Ordered Graphs", Proceedings of the 8th International Conference on Formal Power Series and Algebraic Combinatorics, 1996, pp. 421–426.

References

External links
Boris Shapiro's home page

1957 births
Living people
Mathematicians from Moscow
Moscow State University alumni
Russian emigrants to Sweden
20th-century Swedish mathematicians
21st-century Swedish mathematicians
Stockholm University alumni
Academic staff of Stockholm University
Topologists